Daniel Juhani Wretström (15 October 1983 – 9 December 2000) was a Swedish neo-nazi of Finnish descent. and white power skinhead murdered in Salem, Sweden.

Background
Wretström played drums in the white power rock band "Vit Legion" ("White Legion").

Wretström lived with his mother, Birgitta, and sister, Sara. His middle name Juhani indicates an immigrant background from Finland. According to Birgitta, Wretström had been diagnosed with ADHD. She described him as a "searcher", who attended a Pentecostal church.

Murder 
Following a conflict at an apartment party in Salem where Wretström, according to witnesses in the investigation, slapped a girl and while drunk and upset at a nearby bus station close to a local youth center a fight broke out between Wretström and a group of young people. It is alleged that, after talk in the area about a racist assaulting a girl at a party, a group of youths followed him to the bus station. A fight ensued in which he was assaulted by the group which the media described as being "from immigrant backgrounds". After he was beaten and rolled into a ditch one assailant called his older and mentally unstable male relative who arrived at the scene armed with a knife and stabbed him multiple times in the neck and throat.

Impact 
Wretström's murder inspired Swedish neo-Nazis, ultra-nationalists and other far-right activists to organize an annual demonstration known as the Salem March  Those activists consider Wretström to be a martyr to their cause. The neo-Nazi group Blood and Honour has called him "the Horst Wessel of our generation", vowing to exact revenge., Blood and Honour wrote "Here is the Horst Wessel of our generation – the figurehead of a new movement – to whom we each owe a blood debt to unite. This morning Europe weeps for a fallen hero. Mark this day – for he shall be avenged. Though his flash has fallen – his spirit lives on." Their demonstrations drew a response from the Swedish group Antifascistisk Aktion.

The murder became the topic in many heated debates and articles in Swedish media, political papers and in Swedish society at that time, and the motives and cause of the murder is still debated even today. The far-right immediately accused multicultural society and left-wing politics and has often protested at media calling Wretström a nazi, while many journalists and papers often mentioned the brawl at the party as the motive. The official police investigation leaves it unclear what really caused the fight and murder since there was many accused and many witnesses who gave different versions of the events.

Stieg Larsson, then the editor of Expo, an anti-racist magazine, denied that the Expo organisation had ever defended the murder of Wretström, pointing out that the Turkish-born journalist Kurdo Baksi had been one of the first to condemn the perpetrators.

Arrest / Prosecution / Release 
The perpetrators were arrested and prosecuted and because of their young age, most were sentenced to youth facilities or community service. The accused murderer who stabbed Wretström was ruled insane at the time of the murder by the court and sentenced to psychiatric care. He was given a new identity and released after 4 years.

Footnotes 

1983 births
2000 deaths
20th-century Swedish people
People murdered in Sweden
Swedish neo-Nazis